Nicklas Nielsen (born 6 February 1997 in Hørning) is a professional Ferrari GT factory racing driver from Denmark.

Career

Karting
Nielsen began karting when he was 4 years old back in 2001. He competed in many international events and championships, winning ten major titles.

Lower formula
In 2016, Nielsen made his single-seater debut in the ADAC Formula 4 Championship in Germany, finishing 8th and winning the Rookie's championship while racing for the Austrian Neuhauser Racing team, scoring 3 podiums and 2 fastest laps.

In 2017, Nielsen returned to the ADAC championship, this time with the US Racing team. Although he did win a race and scored 3 podiums, a team disqualification at the Lausitzring event and a major accident induced by a competitor which caused irreparable damage to his car for the rest of the event at the Nürburgring deprived him of a proper chance to fight for the title.

Sports cars

In 2018, not having the budget to continue single-seater racing, Nielsen participated in the Ferrari Challenge in Europe where he took 10 wins in 14 races. That performance was noticed by Luzich Racing which offered Nielsen a race seat alongside Fabien Lavergne and established Ferrari GT-racer Alessandro Pier Guidi in the 2019 European Le Mans Series in the LMGTE Class, which they won.

In 2019, Nielsen became an official Ferrari driver, racing for the Italian AF Corse team. He finished third with teammates François Perrodo and Emmanuel Collard at the 24 Hours of Le Mans and became World Champion in the GTE-Am Class.

Racing record

Career summary

Complete ADAC Formula 4 Championship results
(key) (Races in bold indicate pole position) (Races in italics indicate fastest lap)

Ferrari Challenge Finali Mondiali results

Complete European Le Mans Series results
(Races in bold indicate pole position; results in italics indicate fastest lap)

Complete FIA World Endurance Championship results

Complete 24 Hours of Le Mans results

Complete WeatherTech SportsCar Championship results
(key) (Races in bold indicate pole position; results in italics indicate fastest lap)

References

External links
 

1997 births
People from Skanderborg Municipality
Danish racing drivers
Living people
ADAC Formula 4 drivers
24 Hours of Daytona drivers
24 Hours of Le Mans drivers
Audi Sport TT Cup drivers
International GT Open drivers
European Le Mans Series drivers
FIA World Endurance Championship drivers
Asian Le Mans Series drivers
WeatherTech SportsCar Championship drivers
Sportspeople from the Central Denmark Region
US Racing drivers
AF Corse drivers
Neuhauser Racing drivers
Karting World Championship drivers

Ferrari Competizioni GT drivers
Le Mans Cup drivers
Iron Lynx drivers
Ferrari Challenge drivers